Michele Lowe (born November 1, 1957) is an American playwright and librettist whose work has been produced on Broadway, off Broadway and around the world. She received the Francesca Primus Prize in 2010 for her play Inana. She is the only playwright in the history of the Steinberg/ATCA New Play Award to be nominated and receive finalist status in one season. She is also the recipient of two Edgerton Foundation New Play Awards. She is Jewish.

Early life and education
Lowe was raised in Massapequa Park, New York.  She is the daughter of Doris Lowe and Marshall Lowe.  She graduated from Massapequa High School in 1975 and received a BSJ from Northwestern University's Medill School of Journalism in 1979.  Ogilvy and Mather attempted to hire her as a copywriter in her junior year, but she opted to remain in school.

Career 
Lowe worked as a copywriter at Foote, Cone & Belding (True North) and later J. Walter Thompson (WPP). In 1984 she won over 50 international awards including a Gold Lion at the Cannes Advertising Film Festival for “I’ll Have the Soup” (Kraft Miracle Whip) and a Clio for "Skunk" (Lowe’s Brand Kitty Litter  (no relation to Ed Lowe). At the time, she was the youngest person ever made a VP at JWT. After a stint as a senior VP and associate creative director at BBDO  she left the business full time and enrolled in Playwrights Horizons Theatre school where she was mentored by Robert Moss and Neal Bell.

Theatre
Lowe is a member of the Dramatists Guild and sits on the Publications Committee. She regularly writes for The Dramatist Guild Magazine.

Plays

The Smell of the Kill
The story of three women who want to kill their husbands and get the chance to do it, The Smell of the Kill premiered at Cleveland Playhouse in 1999. Elizabeth Ireland and Nelle Nugent teamed up to produce it on Broadway. It opened in March 2002 at the Helen Hayes Theater with Chris Ashley directing. It has been produced hundreds of times around the world and translated into over two dozen languages including French, Korean, Greek, Spanish, Estonian, Czech, and Icelandic.

String of Pearls
String of Pearls is about a group of women and the necklace that touches each of them over the course of 35 years. Four actresses play 27 roles. The show opened at City Theatre Pittsburgh in 2003 and was then produced by Primary Stages off Broadway at 59 E 59 Theater in October 2004 with Eric Simon directing.

Inana
On the eve of the U.S. invasion of Baghdad, one man, an Iraqi museum curator plots to save the statue of Inana, Goddess of War and Sex, from destruction. Fleeing to London with his young bride, he makes a life-altering deal to ensure the statue's preservation. A window of hope and healing, a love story amidst a background of international and personal intrigue. Inana opened at Denver Center Theatre with Michael Pressman directing in January, 2009.

Other plays
 Moses (2021)
 The Greatest (2017)
 Map of Heaven (2011)
 Victoria Musica (2009)
 A Thousand Words Come to Mind with composer Scott Davenport Richards (2008)
 Mezzulah, 1946 (2007)
 Backsliding in the Promised Land (2003)

Other works
 Queen Esther monologue in Motherhood Out Loud (2011)

Residencies
 Cape Cod Theatre Project (2020)
 Artist in Residence, Sundance Theatre Lab (2017)
 New York Stage and Film (2012, 2002)
 New Harmony Project (2006)
 Colorado New Play Summit (2005, 2008)
 Play Labs, Playwrights Center (2006)
 O’Neill National Music Theatre Conference (1991)
 Hedgebrook (2000)

Awards and nominations
 2021 Theater J Trish Vradenburg New Play Prize (finalist) - Moses
 2010 Edgerton New Play Award
 2010 Francesca Primus Prize
 2010 Steinberg/ATCA New Play Award (finalist) - Inana
 2010 Steinberg/ATCA New Play Award (finalist)- Victoria Musica
 2009 Susan Smith Blackburn Prize (finalist) - Inana
 2008 Edgerton New Play Award
 2005 Outer Critics Circle Best Play (nomination) — String of Pearls
 2004 Robert M Frankel Award, City Theatre, Pittsburgh 
 1984 Gold Lion, Cannes Advertising Film Festival, Kraft Miracle Whip "I'll Have the Soup"
 1984 Clio — Lowe’s Kitty Litter "Skunk"

Personal life
Lowe resides in New York and is the mother of Isadora Lowe Porte.

References

External links

1957 births
Living people
Medill School of Journalism alumni
Women librettists
American women dramatists and playwrights
American librettists
21st-century American dramatists and playwrights
People from Hempstead (town), New York
People from Massapequa Park, New York
Writers from New York (state)